Martti Kalevi Marjamaa (born January 29, 1953) is a retired male boxer from Finland, who represented his native country twice at the Summer Olympics: in 1976 and 1980.

Marjamaa was born in Nivala.  He was nicknamed "Kalle" during his career. He is the brother-in-law of Finnish sprint athlete Helinä Laihorinne-Marjamaa.

1976 Olympic results
Below is the record of Kalevi Marjamaa, a Finnish welterweight boxer who competed at the 1976 Montreal Olympics:

 Round of 64: lost to Valeri Rachkov (Soviet Union) referee stopped contest in third round

References
 sports-reference

1953 births
Living people
People from Nivala
Welterweight boxers
Boxers at the 1976 Summer Olympics
Boxers at the 1980 Summer Olympics
Olympic boxers of Finland
Finnish male boxers
Sportspeople from North Ostrobothnia